Ink Master: Turf War is the thirteenth season of the tattoo reality competition Ink Master that premiered on Paramount Network on January 7 and ended on April 14, 2020 with a total of fifteen episodes. The show is hosted and judged by Jane's Addiction guitarist Dave Navarro, with accomplished tattoo artists Chris Núñez and Oliver Peck serving as series regular judges. The winner was to receive $100,000, a feature in Inked magazine and the title of Ink Master. Due to the COVID-19 pandemic in the United States, the live finale was cancelled and no winner was announced for this season.

The premise of this season was having four teams based on their respective home region with each region being led by an Ink Master veteran.

This season saw the return of four veterans; season ten contestants Jason Elliott and Frank Ready, who originally finished the competition in 4th and 8th place respectively, and season eleven contestants Angel Rose and Jimmy Snaz, who originally finished the competition in 11th and 10th place respectively.

There was no winner for the thirteenth season of Ink Master, due to the COVID-19 pandemic. The three finalists (Bob Jones, Angel Rose and Jimmy Snaz) were awarded an undisclosed value monetary prize instead. The master canvases were revealed on YouTube Live.

Judging and ranking

Judging Panel
The judging panel is a table of three or more primary judges in addition to the coaches. The judges make their final decision by voting to see who had best tattoo of the day, and who goes home.

Jury of Peers
The artist who wins best tattoo of the day gives his/her respective team and another team the power to put up one artist for elimination.

Pardon
Each of the three judges can give a pardon to any eliminated artist of their choosing so that they may return to the competition after being eliminated.

Contestants
Names, experience, and cities stated are at time of filming.

Notes

Regions

Returning veterans

Contestant progress
 Indicates the contestant represented the East region.
 Indicates the contestant represented the Midwest region.
 Indicates the contestant represented the South region.
 Indicates the contestant represented the West region.

 The contestant advanced to the finale.
 The contestant was exempt from the first elimination.
 The contestant won Best Tattoo of the Day.
 The contestant won their Head-to-Head challenge.
 The contestant was among the top.
 The contestant received positive critiques.
 The contestant received mixed critiques.
 The contestant received negative critiques.
 The contestant was in the bottom.
 The contestant was put in the bottom by the Jury of Peers
 The contestant was eliminated from the competition.
 The contestant was put in the bottom by the Jury of Peers and was eliminated from the competition.
 The contestant was pardoned by a judge and re-entered the competition.
 The contestant quit the competition.

Episodes

References

External links
 
 
 

2020 American television seasons
Ink Master
Television productions cancelled due to the COVID-19 pandemic